Preissler is a German surname. Notable people with the surname include:

Alfred Preissler (1921–2003), German footballer and manager
Fritz Preissler (1908–1948), German-Bohemian luger
Johann Daniel Preissler (1666–1737), German engraver and painter
Johann Justin Preissler (1698–1771), German painter and draughtsman

German-language surnames